Satam or Sattam (Arabic: سطام) is an Arabic male given name. It may refer to:

People

First name
Satam al-Suqami (1976–2001), Saudi Arabian terrorist
Sattam bin Abdulaziz Al Saud (1941–2013), Saudi Arabian politician and governor
Sattam bin Khalid bin Nasser Al Saud, Saudi Arabian prince

Surname
Ameet Bhaskar Satam (born 1977), Indian politician
A. N. Sattam Pillai (1823–1918), Indian theologian
Shivaji Satam (born 1950), Indian actor

Other uses
Sattam, 1983 film
Sattam En Kaiyil, 1978 film
Sattam Oru Iruttarai, 1981 film
Sattam Oru Iruttarai, 2012 film
Sattam Oru Vilayaattu, 1987 film
Sattam Sirikkiradhu, 1982 film

See also
Prince Sattam Bin Abdulaziz University, Saudi Arabia
Sonic the Hedgehog (TV series), a Saturday morning cartoon also known as Sonic SatAM

Arabic masculine given names